Sar Choqa or Sar Cheqa may refer to:
 Sar Choqa, Ilam
 Sar Choqa-ye Olya, Isfahan Province
 Sar Choqa-ye Sofla, Isfahan
 Sar Cheqa, Kermanshah
 Sar Chaqa